Paul Mugnier (10 February 1906 – 30 January 1985) was a French cross-country skier. He competed in the men's 18 kilometre event at the 1932 Winter Olympics.

References

1906 births
1985 deaths
French male cross-country skiers
Olympic cross-country skiers of France
Cross-country skiers at the 1932 Winter Olympics
Sportspeople from Haute-Savoie
20th-century French people